Merel Westrik (born 1 November 1979 in Wormer, Netherlands) is a Dutch news presenter and television host.

Career 

In 2013, she was a candidate in four episodes of the game show De Slimste Mens.

In 2019, she participated in the reality television show Wie is de Mol? playing the role of the mole. She was correctly identified by actress Sarah Chronis who won the prize money of €10,150. In February 2019, Westrik participated in the game show Weet Ik Veel and she won that edition of the show. In the summer of 2019 she was also a co-presenter during one week of the talk show Zomer met Art alongside Art Rooijakkers as main presenter.

In 2019 and 2020, she presented the talk show Ladies Night. In 2020, she appeared in an episode of Wie is de Mol? Renaissance, a season to celebrate the 20th anniversary season of the show Wie is de Mol?.

In 2021, she appeared in an episode of Verborgen verleden in which she explores her family history.

Filmography

As presenter 

 Ladies Night (2019, 2020)

As contestant 

 De Slimste Mens (2013)
 Weet Ik Veel (2019)
 Wie is de Mol? (2019)

References

External links 
 

1979 births
Living people
Dutch television presenters
Dutch television news presenters
People from Wormerland
21st-century Dutch women